Udea grisealis is a moth in the family Crambidae. It was described by Hiroshi Inoue, Hiroshi Yamanaka and Akio Sasaki in 2008. It is found on Honshu in Japan.

References

Moths described in 2008
grisealis